In enzymology, an amine sulfotransferase is an enzyme that catalyzes the chemical reaction

3'-phosphoadenylyl sulfate + an amine  adenosine 3',5'-bisphosphate + a sulfamate

Thus, the two substrates of this enzyme are 3'-phosphoadenylyl sulfate and amine, whereas its two products are adenosine 3',5'-bisphosphate and sulfamate.

This enzyme belongs to the family of transferases, specifically the sulfotransferases, which transfer sulfur-containing groups.  The systematic name of this enzyme class is 3'-phosphoadenylyl-sulfate:amine N-sulfotransferase. Other names in common use include arylamine sulfotransferase, and amine N-sulfotransferase.  This enzyme participates in sulfur metabolism.

References

 
 

EC 2.8.2
Enzymes of unknown structure